Campo Bonito is a census-designated place (CDP) in Pinal County, Arizona, United States. The population was 74 at the 2010 census.

Demographics 

As of the census of 2010, there were 74 people living in the CDP. The population density was 217.4 people per square mile. The racial makeup of the CDP was 91% White, 5% from other races, and 4% from two or more races. 19% of the population were Hispanic or Latino of any race.

Notes

Census-designated places in Pinal County, Arizona